This is a list of historic places in Capitale-Nationale, Quebec, entered on the Canadian Register of Historic Places, whether they are federal, provincial, or municipal. All addresses are the administrative Region 03. For all other listings in the province of Quebec, see List of historic places in Quebec.

Notes

See also
List of National Historic Sites of Canada in Quebec City

Capitale
Capitale-Nationale